Patricia Van Pelt Watkins (born November 20, 1957) is a member of the Illinois Senate, representing the 5th district, which is located on the West Side of Chicago. Prior to her service as a member of the Illinois Senate she was a community activist and ran for Mayor of Chicago.

Early life and career
Van Pelt was born on the Near North Side and raised in the Cabrini–Green public housing. Inspired by her mother's ability to work, raise her children and go to school, she took a job as a steelworker while taking classes at Truman College. She earned a bachelor's in public administration and became a CPA after taking accounting classes at DePaul University.

Using her life experience and education, she founded Target Development Corp which worked to improve communities. This including teaching residents how to peacefully evict drug dealers from their neighborhoods. In 2009, she earned a doctorate degree in management of non profit organizations from Capella University.

Chicago mayoral election, 2011

In 2010, Van Pelt announced that she was going to run for mayor in order to bring ideas to the forefront that had been forgotten about. During the campaign, she was accused of "being strung out on crack for twenty years," by candidate and former US Senator Carol Moseley Braun, which Watkins credits to her future political success. She finished fifth on election day.

After the election, Van Pelt was appointed by the Illinois State Board of Education to the State Charter School Commission for a term ending November 1, 2013. The State Charter School Commission authorizes charter schools throughout the State, particularly schools designed to expand opportunities for at-risk students.

Illinois State Senator

2012 Senate election

In 2011, Van Pelt announced that she would challenge Annazette Collins for the Illinois Senate's 5th district. During the primary election she was endorsed by several aldermen from the fifth district, and the Chicago Journal.

Aldermanic endorsements included Walter Burnett and Bob Fioretti. Fioretti stated that "Her integrity is beyond reproach. She will roll her sleeves up and research the issues and make the right decisions for all the people. She won't be beholden to the special interests that control Springfield right now." She was also endorsed by Illinois Secretary of State Jesse White, who previously supported Collins, after Collins's corruption came to the forefront. Van Pelt beat Collins by a 54%-46% margin.

Tenure
Van Pelt was sworn in on January 9, 2013.

As of July 2022, Senator Van Pelt is a member of the following Illinois Senate committees:

 Agriculture Committee (SAGR)
 Appropriations - State Law Enforcement Committee (SAPP-SASL)
 Appropriations - Health Committee (SAPP-SAHA)
 Criminal Law Committee (SCCL)
 Energy and Public Utilities Committee (SENE)
 (Chairwoman of) Healthcare Access and Availability Committee (SHAA)
 Redistricting - Chicago West and Western Cook County (SRED-SRWW)
 State Government Committee (SGOA)

References

External links
Biography, bills and committees at the 98th Illinois General Assembly
By session: 99th, 98th
Illinois State Senator Van Pelt legislative website
Senator Patricia Van Pelt Watkins at Illinois Senate Democrats
Patricia Van Pelt Watkins for Senate campaign website
 

Democratic Party Illinois state senators
Women state legislators in Illinois
Living people
Politicians from Chicago
DePaul University alumni
1957 births
21st-century American politicians
21st-century American women politicians